The Mill in the Black Forest is a 1953 West German drama film directed by Hermann Kugelstadt and starring Edith Mill, Helmuth Schneider and Albert Hehn. It was shot at the Bavaria Studios in Munich. The film's sets were designed by the art director Max Seefelder. Location shooting took place at Furtwangen in the Black Forest and Bingen on the Rhine.

Cast
 Edith Mill as Gertrud
 Helmuth Schneider as Paul Kemper
 Albert Hehn as Philipp Kemper
 Fritz Rasp as Hotel-Oigatemr Rapp
 Ruth Lommel as Frau Schulze
 Ernst Waldow as Herr Schulze
 Albert Florath as Kabideen Himpel
 Beppo Brem as Mahlmoischtr Sepp

References

Bibliography 
 Hans-Michael Bock and Tim Bergfelder. The Concise Cinegraph: An Encyclopedia of German Cinema. Berghahn Books, 2009.

External links 
 

1953 films
1953 drama films
German drama films
West German films
1950s German-language films
Films directed by Hermann Kugelstadt
German black-and-white films
1950s German films
Films shot at Bavaria Studios